The right marginal vein is a vein of the heart running along the inferior margin of the heart. It drains adjacent region of the right ventricle. It usually opens directly into the right atrium, but may sometimes instead empty into the anterior cardiac veins, or (less commonly) the coronary sinus.

The right marginal vein often considered as one of the anterior cardiac veins.

References

Veins of the torso